Charles Warren Lippitt (October 8, 1846 – April 4, 1924) was an American politician and the 44th Governor of Rhode Island.

Early life
Lippitt was born in Providence, Rhode Island on October 8, 1846. He graduated from Brown University. Later, he was involved in his father's cotton and woolen manufacturing firm.

Family
His father, Henry Lippitt, was governor of Rhode Island from 1875 to 1877 and his brother Henry F. Lippitt was a United States senator from Rhode Island. He married Margaret B. Farnum on February 23, 1886.

His son, Charles Warren Lippitt, Jr. (1894–1970), attended Harvard College and served as a sergeant in the 103rd Field Artillery Regiment during the First World War.

Another son, Alexander Farnum Lippitt (b. 1896), attended Harvard from 1916 to 1917. He enlisted in the Army in August 1917 and served as a 1st Lieutenant in the 166th Infantry Regiment of the 42nd Division.  He was awarded the Distinguished Service Cross for leading his men in a counterattack against the Germans.   He was wounded in action, sent back to the United States and died at Fort Mott in Cape May, New Jersey on October 6, 1918.  Lippitt Park in Providence was dedicated in his memory.

Political career
Lippitt served as a military aide, with the rank of colonel, to his father during his father's term of office as governor from 1875 to 1877.

Lippitt served as Governor of Rhode Island from May 29, 1895 to May 25, 1897.

He was an unsuccessful candidate for Republican nomination for Vice President in 1896.

Lippitt's Castle
In 1899 Lippitt built an immense castle style brick mansion, near Bailey's Beach in Newport, Rhode Island, named Lippitt's Castle. After Lippitt's death his son Charles Jr. had the castle torn down and sold the land. It was replaced in 1926 by a mansion named The Waves on the same foundation for the castle. The Waves was designed by renowned architect John Russell Pope as his own summer residence. Bricks from Lippitt's Castle can still be found in the waters near where the mansion once stood.

Memberships
Lippitt joined the Rhode Island Society of the Sons of the American Revolution in 1896 and served as the Society's president from 1908 to 1909.  In 1897 he was admitted as an hereditary member of the Rhode Island Society of the Cincinnati.

His sons, Charles Warren Lippitt, Jr. and Gorton Thayer Lippitt, also joined the Sons of the American Revolution.  Charles, Jr. became a member of the Society of the Cincinnati after his father's death and Gorton became a member after Charles' death in 1970.  Upon the death of Gorton, in 1978, the family's "seat" in the Society was "inherited" by their cousin Frederick Lippitt, who held the seat until his own death in 2005.

Death

Governor Charles Warren Lippitt died in Yorktown, New York on April 4, 1924. He was interred in the Swan Point Cemetery in Providence.

Legacy
Lippitt Hall on the central quad of the University of Rhode Island in Kingston is named after Governor Charles W. Lippitt.

Sources
 Sobel, Robert and John Raimo. Biographical Directory of the Governors of the United States, 1789-1978. Greenwood Press, 1988.

References

1846 births
1924 deaths
Republican Party governors of Rhode Island
Brown University alumni
Lippitt family
Burials at Swan Point Cemetery
19th-century American businesspeople